Anna Nikulina (born 23 March 1985) is a Russian ballet dancer who has been with the Bolshoi Ballet in Moscow since 2002, and a principal dancer in the company since 2015. Her first lead role was Odette-Odile in Swan Lake in 2004 at the age of 19. She has toured both internationally and within Russia. In previous years her répétiteurs have been the important Russian dancers Ekaterina Maximova, and Ludmila Semenyaka. She graduated in 2002 with honors from the Moscow State Academy of Choreography.

She has worked with Russian choreographer Yury Grigorovich in performance of his productions.  In late 2021 when Grigorovich received an artistic award but could not travel due to pandemic restrictions, Nikulina accepted the award on his behalf.

Tours

She has appeared in lead roles with the Bolshoi on tour in New York City (2014), Washington DC, Los Angeles, Sydney Australia, Hong Kong, and London.  As visiting artist she has led shows with the Teatro dell'Opera di Roma in Rome (2018), and tours of Greece and Israel.

In Russia, where the Bolshoi and the Ministry of Culture support the touring of soloists to major cities within the Federation, she has appeared with the ballet companies of Kazan (2011), Samara (2014), Ufa (2015), Chelyabinsk (2011, 2015), Saratov (2016), and Novosibirsk (2019).

Alluding to the various endings of Swan Lake, she remarked in an interview that, “You never know what to expect from the Swan.  In Moscow they kill me, in Kazan I am happy with the prince, but here, in Chelyabinsk, I am left alone on the lake."

Roles
(Year of first performance)

Awards
 2004: Youth Grant Russia prize "Triumph"
 2018: Merited Artist of the Russian Federation

References

1985 births
Living people
Dancers from Moscow
Russian ballerinas
Bolshoi Ballet principal dancers
21st-century Russian ballet dancers